Leena Kristiina Meri (born 12 April 1968) is a Finnish politician, representing the Finns Party in the Parliament of Finland. She has served in the Parliament since 2015 and in the City Council of Hyvinkää since 2013.

Meri run to the Parliament in the 2015 parliamentary election from the Uusimaa electoral district, but her 2,493 votes were not enough to get elected. However, as MP Pirkko Ruohonen-Lerner left her seat to work in the European Parliament in May 2015, Meri took the vacated seat in the Finnish Parliament.

In June 2017, Meri took part in the leadership election of the Finns Party, but finished third behind Jussi Halla-aho and Sampo Terho. The leadership election sparked resistance within the party and soon after the majority of its MPs left to form the Blue Reform. After the split, Meri was chosen as the chair of the party's parliamentary group.

References

1968 births
Living people
Politicians from Helsinki
Finns Party politicians
Members of the Parliament of Finland (2015–19)
Members of the Parliament of Finland (2019–23)
21st-century Finnish women politicians
Women members of the Parliament of Finland
University of Helsinki alumni